Kangzhuang Town is a town in the Yanqing District of Beijing. It borders Zhangshanying and Yanqing Towns to its north, Dayushu Town to its east, Badaling Town to its southeast, Donghuayuan and Xiaonanxinbao Towns to its southwest, and has several pieces of lands north of the Guishui River. The census had counted 32,815 residents for this town in 2020.

It is named Kangzhuang because Kang was the most popular surname in the region during the founding of the settlement in 1593.

Geography 
Kangzhuang is located on the eastern portion of Yanhuai Basin, and on the southern bank of Guishui River. Beijing–Baotou railway and Kangzhuang-Yanqing Railway pass through the town.

History

Administrative divisions 
By 2021, Kangzhuang Town comprised 34 subdivisions, with 3 communities and 31 villages. Here is a table listing all the subdivisions:

See also 

 List of township-level divisions of Beijing

References

Yanqing District
Towns in Beijing